Yardville is an unincorporated community and census-designated place (CDP) located within Hamilton Township, in Mercer County, New Jersey, United States. As of the 2010 United States Census, the CDP's population was 2,945. Before the 2010 Census, the area was part of the Yardville-Groveville CDP.

Geography
According to the United States Census Bureau, the CDP had a total area of 4.074 square miles (10.551 km2), including 4.051 square miles (10.492 km2) of land and 0.023 square miles (0.059 km2) of water (0.56%).

Demographics

2010 Census

References

Census-designated places in Mercer County, New Jersey
Hamilton Township, Mercer County, New Jersey